Lucien Bégouin (17 April 1908, Angoulême – 27 December 1998) was a French politician. He represented the Radical Party in the National Assembly from 1946 to 1958.

References

1908 births
1998 deaths
People from Angoulême
Politicians from Nouvelle-Aquitaine
Radical Party (France) politicians
Deputies of the 1st National Assembly of the French Fourth Republic
Deputies of the 2nd National Assembly of the French Fourth Republic
Deputies of the 3rd National Assembly of the French Fourth Republic
French military personnel of World War II